Debbie Mathieson is a former association football player who represented New Zealand at an international level.

Mathieson made her Football Ferns début in a 1–2 loss to Australia on 4 October 1981, and made just one further appearance, in a 2–0 win over the Netherlands on 22 October that same year.

References

Year of birth missing (living people)
Living people
New Zealand women's association footballers
New Zealand women's international footballers
Women's association footballers not categorized by position